Gojri is one of the 51 union councils of Abbottabad District in Khyber-Pakhtunkhwa province of Pakistan. According to the 2017 Census of Pakistan, the population is 15,009.

Subdivisions
 Gojri
 Halmera Tarla
 Halmera Utla
 Saji Kot
 Tanan

References

Union councils of Abbottabad District